Seydgah-e Haviq (also Romanized as Şeydgāh-e Ḩavīq) is a village in Haviq Rural District, Haviq District, Talesh County, Gilan Province, Iran. At the 2006 census, its population was 626, in 127 families.

References 

Populated places in Talesh County